Edward Thomas Begay (January 8, 1935 – June 12, 2022) was a Native American politician who served as the Speaker of the Navajo Nation from 1999 to 2003. He also served as Vice-Chairman in 1983 under the Chairmanship of then Chairman Peterson Zah. Begay was a major influence in the  community, and was active within Chapter Affairs.

Begay served in the United States Army. He also served on the McKinley County Commission. He died on June 12, 2022, at the age of 87 in Albuquerque.

References

External links 
 Interview by the Institute of Tribal Government (2001)

1935 births
2022 deaths
People from McKinley County, New Mexico
Military personnel from New Mexico
County commissioners in New Mexico
Members of the Navajo Nation Council
Speakers of the Navajo Nation Council
20th-century Native American politicians
21st-century Native American politicians